Batsada is a rural locality (a selo) and the administrative centre of Batsadinsky Selsoviet, Gunibsky District, Republic of Dagestan, Russia. The population was 754 as of 2010. There are 2 streets.

Geography 
Batsada is located 23 km southwest of Gunib (the district's administrative centre) by road. Kulla and Shulani are the nearest rural localities.

References 

Rural localities in Gunibsky District